Introducing Carl Perkins is the sole album led by American jazz pianist Carl Perkins recorded in 1955 and released on the Dootone label the following year.

Reception

The Allmusic review by Michael G. Nastos stated: "Recorded two years before legendary West Coast pianist's death.  ... Six Perkins originals make this an important document. He was an important sideman. Here as a leader he shows his true worth".

Track listing
All compositions by Carl Perkins except where noted
 "Way Cross Town" – 3:40
 "You Don't Know What Love Is" (Gene de Paul, Don Raye) – 3:28
 "The Lady Is a Tramp" (Richard Rodgers, Lorenz Hart) – 3:15
 "Marblehead" – 3:40
 "Woody 'n' You" (Dizzy Gillespie) – 4:13
 "Westside" – 2:05
 "Just Friends" (John Klenner, Sam M. Lewis) – 2:45
 "It Could Happen to You" (Jimmy Van Heusen, Johnny Burke) – 3:03
 "Why Do I Care" – 4:00
 "Lilacs in the Rain" (Peter DeRose, Mitchell Parish) – 3:25
 "Carl's Blues" – 4:50

Personnel
Carl Perkins – piano
Leroy Vinnegar – bass
Larance Marable – drums

References

Carl Perkins (pianist) albums
1956 albums